Casilda consecraria is a species of moth in the family Geometridae. It is found in France and Spain and on Sardinia, Sicily and Cyprus. It has also been recorded from Israel.

References

External links

Lepiforum.de

Moths described in 1858
Rhodometrini
Moths of Europe
Taxa named by Otto Staudinger